The End of the F***ing World is a British black comedy-drama television programme. The eight-part first series premiered its first episode on Channel 4 in the United Kingdom on 24 October 2017, after which the following episodes were released on All 4. Netflix handled international distribution and released it internationally on 5 January 2018. The programme follows James (Alex Lawther), a 17-year-old who believes himself to be a psychopath, and Alyssa (Jessica Barden), an angry classmate who sees in James a chance to escape from her tumultuous home life. Gemma Whelan, Wunmi Mosaku, Steve Oram, Christine Bottomley, Navin Chowdhry, Barry Ward and Naomi Ackie appear in supporting roles.

The series is based on Charles Forsman's mini-comics The End of the Fucking World, which were collected into a book in 2013. Series creator Jonathan Entwistle contacted him about making a film, and a short was made in 2014. The short film is now considered to be lost, with no way to access the film online. Instead, an eight-part serial was commissioned, with filming beginning in April 2017. It was written by Charlie Covell, and episodes were directed by Entwistle and Lucy Tcherniak. In August 2018, the programme was renewed for a second series, which premiered on Channel 4 on 4 November 2019, after which all eight episodes were released on All 4, and internationally on Netflix the next day. Covell stated before the second series' release that she does not intend to produce a third series for the programme.

The programme has been praised for its writing, execution and subject matter, as well as for Lawther's and Barden's performances. Both series were nominated for the British Academy Television Award for Best Drama Series, with the second series winning in 2020, as well as receiving a Peabody Award in 2019.

Premise
James is a 17-year-old who believes he is a psychopath. He kills animals as a hobby, but grows bored with the practice. He decides he wants to try killing a human. He settles on Alyssa; a mouthy, rebellious 17-year-old classmate with issues of her own. She proposes they run away together, hoping for an adventure away from her turbulent home-life, and James agrees with the intention of finding an opportunity to kill her. They embark on a road trip across England and begin to develop a relationship after a series of mishaps. However, in series two they grow distant and Alyssa proposes to another man. But someone thirsty for revenge for what they did hunts them down, bringing them together once again.

Cast and characters

Main
 Alex Lawther as James, a 17-year-old who believes he is a psychopath; the disturbed love interest of Alyssa
Jack Veal portrays a young James
 Jessica Barden as Alyssa, a rebellious teenage girl. Initially James's intended victim but later his love interest.
Holly Beechey portrays a young Alyssa
 Naomi Ackie as Bonnie, a love interest of Clive Koch. She believes that James and Alyssa murdered Clive out of spite, and is determined to take revenge on the pair (series 2)

Recurring
 Gemma Whelan as Eunice Noon, a detective constable and Darego's partner (series 1)
 Wunmi Mosaku as Teri Darego, a detective constable and Noon's stern partner (series 1)
 Steve Oram as Phil, James's father
 Christine Bottomley as Gwen, Alyssa's mother
 Navin Chowdhry as Tony, Alyssa's abusive stepfather (series 1)
 Jonathan Aris as Clive Koch, an author, professor, serial killer, rapist and James's first human victim
 Barry Ward as Leslie Foley, Alyssa's estranged drug-dealing father (series 1)

Guest
 Kierston Wareing as Debbie, Leslie's ex-girlfriend with whom he has a child (series 1)
 Geoff Bell as Martin, a family man who gives Alyssa and James a ride (series 1)
 Alex Sawyer as Topher, a young man Alyssa meets with whom she tries to have sex with (series 1)
 Eileen Davies as Flora, Clive's mother (series 1)
 Earl Cave as Frodo, a miserable petrol station employee (series 1)
 Felicity Montagu as Jocelyn, the manager of the petrol station (series 1)
 Alex Beckett as Jonno, one of Leslie's buyers (series 1)
 Leon Annor as Emil, an imposing store security guard whom Alyssa is caught by (series 1)
 Matt King as Eddie Onslow, a detective constable (series 1)
 Kelly Harrison as James's dead mother (series 1)
 Zerina Imsirovic as Alyssa's baby sister (series 1)
 Josh Dylan as Todd, Alyssa's husband (series 2)
 Alexandria Riley as Leigh, Gwen's sister (series 2)
 Florence Bell as Iggy (series 2)
 Tim Key as Gus, a motel owner who tries to sexually assault Bonnie but is accidentally killed by her (series 2)
 Paterson Joseph as Kevan, a chemist (series 2)
 Divian Ladwa as Sid, a police officer (series 2)
 Lynn Hunter as Jerry (series 2)

Episodes

Series 1 (2017)

Series 2 (2019)

Production

Development
The series was based on the work of the same title by Charles Forsman. Originally self-published as a series of mini-comics, the series was published as a graphic novel by Fantagraphics Books in 2013. It was republished in hardback in 2017, in anticipation of the television series.

While Forsman was publishing the mini-comics, Jonathan Entwistle contacted him about adapting it to a visual format – the original idea was to make an American film, and later a web series was considered. A film was pitched to Film4, and Entwistle was given funding for a short. Made in 2014, it featured some cast and crew who continued their roles for the television series. Entwistle directed and Dominic Buchanan was producer; Jessica Barden played Alyssa. However, instead of Alex Lawther, James was played by Craig Roberts.

Though the short was well-received, no production companies wanted to invest in the idea as a full-length film. Entwistle and Buchanan decided to make a television series with Clerkenwell Films, following which Channel 4 and then Netflix became involved. Forsman had no official role in the show's production, wanting to continue working on his comics, though Entwistle would regularly consult him and keep him updated. In August 2018, Channel 4's director of programmes Ian Katz expressed frustration that many people think the programme is a Netflix original, saying that "it's absolutely a Channel 4 show".

The programme's plot differs from that of Forsman's comics. In print, the two kill a satanist serial killer, whose wife was a police officer; instead the television series features police officers Eunice Noon and Teri Darego, and does not show the serial killer to be a satanist. Another major difference is the ending of the graphic novel: the satanist police officer chases after James, and the two begin to attack each other, while police try to break up the fight. There is then a gunshot. In the final scene, Alyssa's mother talks about her daughter being safe from James, while Alyssa is seen carving the name "JAMES" into her arm. Some critics interpreted this to mean that James was dead, but Forsman sees the ending as ambiguous.

Continuation
The first series covered the entirety of the storyline in Forsman's original comics. On 25 January 2018, Jonathan Entwistle spoke of the potential for a second series. He confirmed that "We're exploring and we're seeing what we can do to expand the world and see where we get to." Entwistle then went on to say that Netflix was enthusiastic about a second series of the show if one could be conceived. Writer Charlie Covell said "I think there are a number of stories we could tell" and that she would "love to write more". Actor Alex Lawther stated in an interview that he would be "very excited" about a second series, as it would give Covell "a chance to explore something from her imagination". A second series was announced on 21 August 2018 on the official Channel 4 Twitter account.

Covell stated in October 2019, before the second series' release, that she does not intend to produce a third series for the programme. Covell went on to say "I think, for me, that's it now. Yeah, that's done. I think to try and eke more out would be wrong, I like where we've left it."

Filming
The first series began filming in April 2017 and concluded a few weeks before the show's release in October 2017. Though filmed in England, the programme has an American tone to it; Entwistle was inspired by Twin Peaks and Fargo. Episodes were filmed largely in suburban areas and across Surrey, with locations such as Guildford bus station, The Square shopping centre in Camberley, Woking and Longcross Studios. There was also some scenes in Bracknell in Berkshire. Another filming location was Leysdown-on-Sea on the Isle of Sheppey. Entwistle uses mostly close-up shots, particularly in early episodes where most frames feature only one character. He uses this for deadpan humour, by moving from face to face to get shots of characters' reactions.

The series is set in the present day, but Entwistle aimed to make it feel like it could have been set "any time from 1988 to 2006". Additionally, diners have a 1970s-style design, and the soundtrack features songs from the 1950s, 60s and 70s, along with original music from Graham Coxon, the founding member of Blur. Entwistle describes Coxon's scores as "guitar-based suburban noir", and notes that more of his music is used in later episodes for the police officers.

The second series began filming in March 2019.
Production for the second season moved to southern Wales and the greater Bristol area. The woodland café was constructed within the Forest of Dean. Key locations in Wales were Port Talbot, Swansea, the Brecon Beacons National Park and the Afan Forest Park.

Release
The eight-part programme premiered its first episode on Channel 4 in the United Kingdom on 24 October 2017, after which all eight episodes were released on All 4. The End of the F***ing World was a co-production with Netflix who exclusively released it internationally on 5 January 2018. On that weekend, sales of the graphic novel rose considerably, with Fantagraphics Books selling out of the current print run according to Forsman.

The second series premiered on Channel 4 on 4 November 2019, with two episodes being broadcast back-to-back daily until 7 November. The full series became available on All 4 after the Channel 4 premiere and internationally on Netflix the next day.

Reception

Critical response
The End of the F***ing World has an overall approval rating of 93% on review aggregation website Rotten Tomatoes. The first series has an approval rating of 96% based on 51 reviews, with an average rating of 8.38/10. The site's consensus states, "Misanthropy and humor blend perfectly in this romantically nihilistic show that proves that falling in love can feel like The End of the F***ing World." The second series has an approval rating of 91% based on 34 reviews, with an average rating of 7.64/10. The site's consensus states, "What The End of the F***ing World'''s second season lacks in urgency it makes up for in character development, diving deep into the darkest creases of the leading pair's memories to emerge a darkly funny meditation on love and trauma."

On Metacritic, the series has an overall score of 77 out of 100, based on reviews from 21 critics, indicating "generally favourable reviews". The first series has a score of 81 out of 100, based on reviews from 12 critics, indicating "universal acclaim". The second series has a score of 71 out of 100, based on reviews from 9 critics, indicating "generally favourable reviews".

Reviewer Daniel Fienberg of The Hollywood Reporter lauded the programme's writing, characters, and soundtrack, as well as praising the performances of Alex Lawther and Jessica Barden, calling it a "pitch-black, eight-episode comedy gem of a UK import". Kelly Lawler of USA Today'' called it "batty fun", also praising Lawther and Barden's performances while praising the programme's surreal concept and execution.

Accolades

Notes

References

External links
 
 The End of the F***ing World on Metacritic
 The End of the F***ing World on Rotten Tomatoes

2017 British television series debuts
2019 British television series endings
2010s British black comedy television series
2010s British comedy-drama television series
2010s British teen television series
British teen drama television series
Burn survivors in fiction
Coming-of-age television shows
Channel 4 comedy dramas
English-language Netflix original programming
Fiction about animal cruelty
Murder in television
Serial drama television series
Television series about teenagers
Television series by Clerkenwell Films
Television shows based on comics